Sphyraena putnamae, the sawtooth, chevron or military barracuda, is a species of barracuda found in the Indo-Pacific region and Japan. It is found in bays, turbid lagoons, and some reefs. A recognizable feature is the many (about 15) dark chevron-shaped markings along its side, and its forked caudal fin.

Ecology 
Sphyraena putnamae is active at night, but also forms large schools during the day.

Prey 
The diet of the sawtooth barracuda consists primarily of ray-finned fish of the families Carangidae, Engraulidae (Anchovies), and Scombridae, and, to a far lesser extent, some molluscs and crustaceans. There is a correlation between the size of the fish and its diet- smaller fish eat more crustaceans, medium-sized fish feed on molluscs and ray-finned fish, while the largest specimens feed exclusively on those fish.

Parasites 
A species of myxozoa (Kudoa barracudai) infecting a S. putnamae's muscles was described from the Red Sea in 2016. They are also parasitized by Bucephalidae flatworm species.

Footnotes

Notes

References 

Predators
Sphyraenidae
Fish of the Indian Ocean